= Shnakule =

Global malware network

Shnakule is the biggest malware network in existence. It averages over 2000 hosts and has had as many as 4357. It targets users while visiting trusted sites and routes them to malware by using relays, exploits, and payload servers. These are continually shifted to new domains.
